Nathan Raymond MacKinnon (born September 1, 1995) is a Canadian professional ice hockey centre and alternate captain for the Colorado Avalanche of the National Hockey League (NHL). MacKinnon was selected first overall by the Avalanche in the 2013 NHL Entry Draft. MacKinnon won the Stanley Cup with the Avalanche in 2022.

Playing career

Early life
MacKinnon was born in Springhill, Nova Scotia, and grew up playing in the minor ice hockey system of Cole Harbour, Nova Scotia. As an atom aged player (under 11), MacKinnon recorded 200 points in 50 games. When MacKinnon was 12 and 13, he played Bantam AAA for the Cole Harbour Red Wings, recording seasons of 110 and 145 points, respectively. After these two seasons, MacKinnon enrolled at Shattuck-Saint Mary's in Faribault, Minnesota. MacKinnon chose to leave his hometown and attend the Minnesota boarding school because of the strength of its ice hockey program. In his first season at Shattuck-Saint Mary's playing with the Bantam Tier I program, he scored 101 points in 58 games to finish second in team scoring. For the 2010–11 season, MacKinnon joined the under-16 Midget program at the school. Despite being the team's second-youngest player, MacKinnon was averaging more than two points a game and was second in team scoring at the midway point of the season. During the season, MacKinnon was named to the team that represented Nova Scotia in the ice hockey tournament at the 2011 Canada Winter Games. At the tournament, MacKinnon scored eight goals and eleven points to finish fourth in tournament scoring as Nova Scotia finished in seventh place. MacKinnon finished his second season at Shattuck-Saint Mary's with 93 points in 40 games played, and was second on the team with 45 goals scored.

Junior
Heading into the 2011 Quebec Major Junior Hockey League (QMJHL) Draft, MacKinnon was widely regarded as the favourite to be selected first overall and was ranked by QMJHL Central Scouting as the best available player. Despite this, MacKinnon spent the day of the draft skating with the Omaha Lancers of the United States Hockey League (USHL), as he was considering playing either college ice hockey in the National Collegiate Athletic Association (NCAA) or major junior ice hockey in the QMJHL. On June 4, 2011, MacKinnon was selected first overall by the Baie-Comeau Drakkar in the 2011 QMJHL Draft. Because MacKinnon did not speak French, there was speculation that he would follow through with his option to play in the USHL until he was eligible for the NCAA, unless his rights were traded to a different QMJHL team. On July 13, 2011, MacKinnon's rights were traded to the Halifax Mooseheads for Carl Gélinas, Francis Turbide, the Mooseheads' first round draft picks in 2012 and 2013 and the Quebec Remparts' first round draft pick in 2013, previously acquired by Halifax. The Mooseheads had been attempting to acquire MacKinnon since Baie-Comeau was awarded the first overall pick in the 2011 draft. MacKinnon scored his first QMJHL hat-trick on December 3, 2011, scoring five goals in a 6–4 victory over the Quebec Remparts. In a league of 18- and 19-year-olds, MacKinnon was only 16 when he accomplished this. The opposing coach for the Remparts was his future coach with the Colorado Avalanche, NHL Hall of Famer Patrick Roy. With five goals in one game, he tied the Mooseheads record for the most goals in a single game held by Jason King.

On May 26, 2013, MacKinnon led the Mooseheads to their first Memorial Cup championship. He was also named Most Valuable Player, scoring a tournament-best seven goals and six assists in four games, and earned a spot on the Tournament All-Star team

On June 24, 2013, leading up to the 2013 NHL Entry Draft, head coach Patrick Roy of the Colorado Avalanche, who owned the first overall selection, stated publicly that his team would select MacKinnon if the draft were held then, despite widespread speculation that the team was likely to select defenceman Seth Jones, who grew up in Denver, Colorado. "It would be tough for us not to take MacKinnon," Roy told ESPN The Magazine. Roy also refused to rule out trading the pick. On June 26, 2013, Avalanche Director of Amateur Scouting Richard Pracey said during a conference call that the team had MacKinnon in their sights. "As of today, we're leaning on Nathan MacKinnon," Pracey said. On June 30, 2013, the Avalanche did indeed use their first overall pick in the draft to select MacKinnon.

Colorado Avalanche

MacKinnon was signed to his first NHL contract, a three-year entry level deal, with the Avalanche on July 9, 2013. MacKinnon made his NHL debut to begin the 2013–14 season on October 2, 2013, becoming the youngest hockey player to ever dress in a regular season game for the Colorado Avalanche franchise, registering two assists in a 6–1 victory over the visiting Anaheim Ducks. MacKinnon scored his first NHL goal October 12, 2013, against Michal Neuvirth of the Washington Capitals during the second period at the Verizon Center.

During the season MacKinnon's role increased, as he was placed on the top two offensive lines. He claimed his first NHL record in becoming the youngest player to record back-to-back two-goal games from January 4–6, 2014, beating Dale Hawerchuk's of the original Winnipeg Jets from 1981. MacKinnon later compiled a 13-game point streak from January 25 to March 6, surpassing Wayne Gretzky (who turned 19 during his first season) to have the longest scoring streak by an 18-year-old in NHL history. MacKinnon finished the regular season appearing in all 82 games and led all rookies with 24 goals and 39 assists for 63 points. MacKinnon became just the third player in the NHL to record seven points in his first two playoff games with a goal and six assists in the first two contests against the Minnesota Wild in the opening round of the 2014 Stanley Cup playoffs. On June 24, 2014, MacKinnon won the Calder Memorial Trophy for the rookie of the year, becoming the youngest player to ever win this trophy and third in Avalanche history behind Chris Drury and Gabriel Landeskog. He was subsequently selected to the NHL All-Rookie Team.

MacKinnon recorded his first career NHL hat trick on February 22, 2015 in a 5–4 win over the Tampa Bay Lightning. He is the youngest player in Avalanche history to record a hat trick.

On July 8, 2016, MacKinnon as a restricted free agent re-signed with the Avalanche, agreeing to a seven-year, $44.1 million contract that averages $6.3 million per season. Later in the offseason, on October 13, 2016, MacKinnon was announced as an alternate captain for the Avalanche.

MacKinnon would play his first NHL All-Star Game on January 10, 2017, as the lone representative of the Colorado Avalanche. He was again selected the following year for the 2018 NHL All-Star Game.

Prior to the 2017–18 season, MacKinnon hired a sports psychologist, which drastically helped him improve his play and emerge as one of the league's premier players.
MacKinnon was named the NHL's First Star of the Week for February 26 through March 4, after scoring five goals, six assists, with four power play points, a +6 rating, and 31 shots in four games. This included his second career five-point night (the previous being a goal and four assists against the Capitals earlier in the season, on November 16, 2017), with MacKinnon scoring two goals and adding three helpers in a 7–1 win over the Minnesota Wild on March 2. On April 26, 2018, MacKinnon was nominated for the Ted Lindsay Award as the NHL's most outstanding player. The following day he was named a Hart Memorial Trophy finalist as the NHL's most valuable player; the award was won by New Jersey Devils' forward Taylor Hall.

On September 11, 2020, MacKinnon won the Lady Byng Memorial Trophy, which is awarded to the "player adjudged to have exhibited the best type of sportsmanship and gentlemanly conduct combined with a high standard of playing ability. 

On June 26, 2022, MacKinnon won his first Stanley Cup championship with the Avalanche. MacKinnon led all skaters with 13 goals in the 2022 playoffs (tied with Evander Kane).

On September 20, 2022, MacKinnon signed an eight-year, $100.8 million contract extension with the Avalanche. The contract carries an average annual value of $12.6 million, the highest in league history.

International play

MacKinnon's first experience with Hockey Canada came when he was named to the Canada Atlantic team for the 2011 World U-17 Hockey Challenge in Winnipeg, Manitoba. Despite being the second-youngest player at the tournament, MacKinnon scored five goals and eight points in only five games to finish seventh in tournament scoring. This included a game in which he scored two goals and two assists to be named player of the game as Canada Atlantic defeated Finland 4–3. His impressive play helped Canada Atlantic to its best finish since the 2005 World U-17 Hockey Challenge, defeating Canada West 2–1 in the fifth place game. The following year, MacKinnon was named to the Canada Atlantic team for the 2012 World U-17 Hockey Challenge in Windsor, Ontario.

On December 13, 2012, MacKinnon was named a member of team Canada for the 2013 World Junior Ice Hockey Championships along with Mooseheads teammate Jonathan Drouin.

At the 2015 World Championships, where Canada won the gold medal for the first time since 2007 with a perfect 10-0 record, MacKinnon finished the tournament with 4 goals and 5 assists.

MacKinnon was a member of Team North America for the 2016 World Cup of Hockey. He played on the third line alongside Johnny Gaudreau and Ryan Nugent-Hopkins.

MacKinnon was selected to play for Team Canada at the 2017 IIHF World Championship, where he placed first in team points to help Canada win a silver medal.

Career statistics

Regular season and playoffs
Bold indicates led league

International

Awards and honours

Acting career
MacKinnon has appeared in a recurring role (along with former Halifax Mooseheads teammate Cameron Critchlow) on the Canadian television show Mr. D, playing a fictionalized version of himself. He first appeared in season 2 episode 4, when he and a teammate have to leave an exam early to play in a school hockey game. When the teammates tell Mr. D (portrayed by Gerry Dee) that they did not finish the exam, he tells them to take it home and return it completed the next day. In season 3 episode 7, he is in detention for missing too much school to play hockey. Mr. D is oblivious to his talent and reprimands him ("Hockey's not a job"), although it is implied that, in the show's timeline, that this takes place prior to the 2013 NHL Entry Draft, where MacKinnon was drafted first overall, despite airing in 2014. In season 4 episode 11, MacKinnon returns to give tickets to an Avalanche game to the school principal. When Mr. D enters the room a moment later, he calls MacKinnon "Mr. Calder" and tells him that he always believed in him. When Mr. D. asks for tickets to a game, MacKinnon tells him that all the games, including those in exhibition and the following season, are sold out.

MacKinnon has also appeared as himself in Trailer Park Boys, season 11 episode 7 at Ricky's ball hockey camp. In 2019, he returned in a voice acting role in Trailer Park Boys: The Animated Series season 1 episode 3, again portraying himself.

He, along with fellow Nova Scotian and NHL player Sidney Crosby, have appeared in a series of Tim Hortons commercials produced for YouTube. During his career, MacKinnon has turned to Crosby for inspiration, including the 2019 Stanley Cup playoffs.

Notes

References

External links

 

1995 births
Living people
Calder Trophy winners
Canadian expatriate ice hockey players in the United States
Canadian ice hockey centres
Canadian male television actors
Canadian male voice actors
Colorado Avalanche draft picks
Colorado Avalanche players
Halifax Mooseheads players
Ice hockey people from Denver
Ice hockey people from Nova Scotia
Lady Byng Memorial Trophy winners
National Hockey League All-Stars
National Hockey League first-overall draft picks
National Hockey League first-round draft picks
People from Cole Harbour, Nova Scotia
People from Cumberland County, Nova Scotia
Sportspeople from Denver
Sportspeople from Halifax, Nova Scotia
Stanley Cup champions